In mathematics—specifically, in differential geometry—a geodesic map (or geodesic mapping or geodesic diffeomorphism) is a function that "preserves geodesics".  More precisely, given two (pseudo-)Riemannian manifolds (M, g) and (N, h), a function φ : M → N is said to be a geodesic map if 
 φ is a diffeomorphism of M onto N; and
 the image under φ of any geodesic arc in M is a geodesic arc in N; and
 the image under the inverse function φ−1 of any geodesic arc in N is a geodesic arc in M.

Examples

 If (M, g) and (N, h) are both the n-dimensional Euclidean space En with its usual flat metric, then any Euclidean isometry is a geodesic map of En onto itself.
 Similarly, if (M, g) and (N, h) are both the n-dimensional unit sphere Sn with its usual round metric, then any isometry of the sphere is a geodesic map of Sn onto itself.
 If (M, g) is the unit sphere Sn with its usual round metric and (N, h) is the sphere of radius 2 with its usual round metric, both thought of as subsets of the ambient coordinate space Rn+1, then the "expansion" map φ : Rn+1 → Rn+1 given by φ(x) = 2x induces a geodesic map of M onto N.
 There is no geodesic map from the Euclidean space En onto the unit sphere Sn, since they are not homeomorphic, let alone diffeomorphic.
 The gnomonic projection of the hemisphere to the plane is a geodesic map as it takes great circles to lines and its inverse takes lines to great circles.
 Let (D, g) be the unit disc D ⊂ R2 equipped with the Euclidean metric, and let (D, h) be the same disc equipped with a hyperbolic metric as in the Poincaré disc model of hyperbolic geometry.  Then, although the two structures are diffeomorphic via the identity map i : D → D, i is not a geodesic map, since g-geodesics are always straight lines in R2, whereas h-geodesics can be curved.
 On the other hand, when the hyperbolic metric on D is given by the Klein model, the identity i : D → D is a geodesic map, because hyperbolic geodesics in the Klein model are (Euclidean) straight line segments.

References

External links
 

Differential geometry
Geodesic (mathematics)